Charles Chan may refer to:

 Charles Chan of Charles and Lee-Lee Chan (1914–2008), father of actor/director Jackie Chan
 Charles Chan (businessman), Singaporean businessman